Eraldo Isidori (17 June 1940 – 16 December 2018) was an Italian politician.

Biography
He became famous in 1979, when his young son, who was 5 years old, disappeared and Blessed John Paul asked the unknown abductor to reveal what happened to the child. In 2010 was chosen to replace Roberto Zaffini as a member of the Italian Chamber of Deputies.

He came up again in 2012, when, during his speech to the Chamber of Deputies, he said some sentences containing many mistakes and grammatical errors. He said, "", translated as "A prison is a penitentiary... it isn't a halyday camp... you have to serve his term of imprisonment... that is up to (literally wait) him... he knew that before he did the violation... I consider as Lega Nord not to exit before his supplied term, thank you."

In 2013, interviewed by journalists of the TV program Le Iene, he made another poor showing, ignoring the word eutanasia (in English euthanasia), declaring that Mozart and Beethoven were Latin American music's composers and affirming that in the Gaza Strip there is a conflict between Christians and Buddhists.

External links
 Video of Isidori's famous speech
 Isidori interviewed by journalists of Le Iene
 Page about Isidori on the Italian Chamber of Deputies' website
 “Quarto grado” svela novità sul caso Isidori La mamma: “Chi sa deve parlare”
 L'amarezza di Eraldo Isidori: "Basta ridere di me"

References 

1940 births
2018 deaths
People from Macerata
Lega Nord politicians
Deputies of Legislature XVI of Italy
Politicians of Marche